James Hunter (born 24 August 1992) is a New Zealand rower.

At the 2013 World Rowing Championships held at Tangeum Lake, Chungju in South Korea, he won a silver medal in the lightweight men's four with James Lassche, Curtis Rapley, and Peter Taylor. At the 2014 World Rowing Championships held at Bosbaan, Amsterdam, he won a silver medal in the lightweight men's four with Peter Taylor, Alistair Bond, and Curtis Rapley. At the 2017 New Zealand rowing nationals at Lake Ruataniwha, he partnered with Tom Murray in the premier men's pair and they became national champions for the second year in a row. At the 2017 World Rowing Championships in Sarasota, Florida, he won a bronze medal with Murray.

References

1992 births
Living people
New Zealand male rowers
World Rowing Championships medalists for New Zealand
Rowers at the 2016 Summer Olympics
Olympic rowers of New Zealand
21st-century New Zealand people